opened in 1934 in Kobe, Hyōgo Prefecture, Japan to display the collection of Kanō Jihei, seventh head of the . As such it was one of the first private museums in Japan. The collection of some 1450 items includes two National Treasures and twenty-two Important Cultural Properties.

Collection

The collection includes Chinese bronzes; Chinese ceramics; silverware, mirrors, and jewelry; writings; and paintings. The two National Treasures in the collection are two Nara-period scrolls from the Sutra of the Wise and Foolish attributed to Emperor Shōmu and seventy-one scrolls of the Nara to Edo periods of the Instruction manual on the Nirvana Sutra. There is also a gold necklace with jadeite magatama dating to the Kofun period (ICP).

Buildings
The reinforced concrete Honkan (main building) with copper-tiled roof, earthen storeroom, and office building, all dating to 1934, and chashitsu or tea house of 1929 are Registered Tangible Cultural Properties. A new wing was opened in 1995 to exhibit Near Eastern carpets.

See also
 List of National Treasures of Japan (writings: others)
 Kobe City Museum
 Hyōgo Prefectural Museum of Art
 Kobe City Museum of Literature

References

External links
  Homepage

Art museums and galleries in Kobe
Art museums established in 1934
1934 establishments in Japan